François Chapot (13 September 1926 – February 1997) was a Swiss sailor. He competed in the 6 Metre event at the 1952 Summer Olympics.

References

External links
 

1926 births
1997 deaths
Swiss male sailors (sport)
Olympic sailors of Switzerland
Sailors at the 1952 Summer Olympics – 6 Metre
Place of birth missing
20th-century Swiss people